Stark Falls Reservoir is a man-made lake on the Raquette River located near Stark, New York. Fish species present in the reservoir are smallmouth bass, largemouth bass, northern pike, yellow perch, black bullhead, tiger muskellunge, rock bass, and walleye. There is a hard ramp boat launch located on the southeast shore.

References 

St. Lawrence County, New York